Killing All That Holds You is the second album by American alternative metal band 10 Years, released in 2004 with new vocalist Jesse Hasek. Although it was not widely distributed, the band sold it at their live shows, and an autographed copy was available on their webstore. The album had been abbreviated as "K.A.T.H.Y". This, along with the band's first album Into the Half Moon, has not been released on Spotify. However, both Killing All That Hold You and Into the Half Moon can be found on YouTube.

According to vocalist Jesse Hasek, Universal Records originally thought the band would re-record Killing All That Holds You for its major-label debut. However, the band recorded an entirely new album with re-recorded versions of "Wasteland" and "Through the Iris."

Track listing

Tracks 11–14 were recorded live at Disc Exchange West in Knoxville, TN on August 27, 2004.
Rerecorded versions of "Wasteland" and "Through the Iris" appear on their follow-up album and major-label debut, The Autumn Effect; the same record also features a studio version of "Insects."
"Silhouette of a Life" was included as a bonus track for the deluxe edition of Feeding the Wolves.

Personnel
10 Years
 Jesse Hasek – vocals
 Ryan "Tater" Johnson – guitar
 Matt Wantland – guitar (tracks 1–10)
 Lewis "Big Lew" Cosby – bass
 Brian Vodinh – drums, guitar (tracks 11–14)

Production
Travis Wyrick – production (tracks 1–10), mixing (tracks 1, 4, 6–8)
10 Years – production (tracks 11–14)
Ulrich Wild – mixing (tracks 2, 3, 5, 10)
Mike Dearing – mixing (track 9)

References

10 Years (band) albums
2004 albums
2005 albums
Self-released albums
Universal Records albums